Robert George Paulsen (born 18 October 1947) is a former Australian cricketer who played first-class cricket from 1966 to 1978.

First-class career
Paulsen was educated at Anglican Church Grammar School in East Brisbane. A leg-spinner, he made his first-class debut for Queensland in 1966–67 at the age of 19 and took 31 wickets at an average of 31.61, including 7 for 73 in the second innings against South Australia in Brisbane.

He was considered a contender for the 1968 tour of England, but his form in the 1967–68 season was not quite sufficient to justify his selection. He took 22 wickets at 39.40. He took 25 wickets in 1968–69, and 24 in 1969–70, but after that his form declined, and he lost his place in the Queensland team to Malcolm Francke.

He moved to Perth, and represented Western Australia regularly for three seasons. Against MCC in 1974–75 he took 7 for 41 to dismiss MCC for 177 after they had been set 298 to win in just over four hours. He had similar success the next season against the West Indians, taking his best figures of 8 for 71 as the West Indians chased 333 in 220 minutes and were dismissed for 217. With this form, Paulsen was considered a possible inclusion in the Australian side to play New Zealand and Pakistan in the 1976/77 Australian season. 

He was less successful in the Sheffield Shield, however, and after a few more matches in 1976–77 and 1977–78 he lost his place in the side.

Later career
Playing for Perth, he was the leading bowler in Western Australian Grade Cricket in 1978–79 with 59 wickets, and again in 1981–82 with 70 wickets. Perth won the Toyota Cup fifty over competition in 1979-80 largely due to Paulsen's spell in the final played at the WACA Ground. He was named a member of the Team of the Century at the club 150th celebration in 2012.

He later served as one of the Directors of Cricket Australia, representing Western Australia, and managed the Australian under-19 team in 2001.

See also
 List of Western Australia first-class cricketers

References

External links
 Bob Paulsen at CricketArchive
 Bob Paulsen at Cricinfo

1947 births
Living people
Queensland cricketers
Western Australia cricketers
Australian cricketers
Australian cricket administrators
Cricketers from Brisbane